Campori is an Italian surname. Notable people with the surname include:

 Anna Campori (1917–2018), Italian actress
 Pietro Campori (–1643), Italian cardinal

See also 
 Campori Madonna, a painting in the Galleria Estense, Modena, Italy

References 

Italian-language surnames